The Ratzinger Circle of Alumni is an initiative by former doctoral and post-doctoral students of theologian Joseph Ratzinger (later Pope Benedict XVI). The Alumni is composed by former students of the universities of Bonn 1959–1963, Münster 1963–1966, Tübingen 1966–1969 and Regensburg 1969–1977. The former students, most of them distinguished professors today, meet with their professor annually in order to discuss and study with their teacher important theological issues while celebrating their devotion to what they consider a special responsibility for the spiritual heritage of their teacher.

Background
The first meeting took place in 1978 and is repeated annually. The long tradition was not interrupted during the Papacy of Ratzinger, despite his role and commitments. This initiative led the alumni to the creation of a foundation, the Ratzinger Foundation and later an award, given to theologians and philosophers every two years.

Members
The 44 members of the Ratzinger Circle of Alumni are:

Prof. Barthélemy Adoukonou, Abidjan, Ivory Coast
Dr. Roman Angulanza, Salzburg, Austria
Dr. Francine Cottage, Münster, Germany
Prof. em. Wolfgang Beinert, Pentling, Germany
Dr. P. Martin Bialas Č.p., Schwarzenfeld, Germany
Dr. Catherine M. Bommes, Regensburg, Germany
Prof. em. DDr. Werner Broker, Greven, Germany
Prof. em. Dr. John Dormann, Bösensell, Germany
Prof. Dr. P. P. Joseph Fessio, Ave Maria University, Florida, United States
Prof. Dr. Henrique de Noronha Galvão, Lisbon, Portugal
Prof. em. Dr. Hahn P.Viktor Czechoslovakia, Cologne
Dr.Dr. Erich Heck, Cologne-Lindenthal, Germany
Pastor I.R. Prelate Dr. Michael Hofmann, Fürth, Germany
Prof. em. Dr. Stephen P. Horn SDS, parish churches and Rome, Italy
Rev. Dr. Werner Hülsenbusch, Münster, Germany
Auxiliary Bishop Hans-Jochen Jaschke, Hamburg
Prof. Jung-Hi (Victoria) Kim, Gwangju, South Korea
Canon Hans Kümmeringer, Salzweg, Germany
Prof. Dr. Dr. Peter Kuhn, Munich, Germany
Dr. John P. Lehmann Dronke CRV, Weilheim, Germany
Sister Dr. Mechtild Linde, Rees, Germany
Sr. Maria Lugosi SSS, Kenmore, New York, United States
Dr. Charles MacDonald, Nova Scotia, Canada
Dr. Venicio Marcolino, Tübingen, Germany
Dr. P. Michael John Marmann, Munich, Germany
Prelate Dr. Helmut Moll, Cologne, Germany
Prof. em. Dr. Vincent Pfnür, Münster, Germany
L. Rev. Dr. Seamus Ryan, Dublin, Ireland
Father Antoine Saroyan, Glendale, California, United States
Prelate Emeritus Professor. Dr. Theo Schäfer, Niederzissen, Germany
Pastor Udo M. Schiffer, King Winter Ittenbach, Germany
Senior teacher Wolfram Schmidt, Kelheim, Germany
Vicar General Hubert J.G.M. Schnackers, Roermond, The Netherlands
Prof. Dr. P. Cardinal Christoph Schönborn OP, Vienna, Austria
Rev. Fr Prof. Alex Thannippara CMI Bellampalli, India
Prof. Dr. P. Réal Tremblay Rome, Italy
Rev. Dr. Martin Trimpe, Lingen - Laxten, Germany
Prof. em. P. Dr. Vincent Twomey SVD, Maynooth, Ireland
Prof. Dr. Hans Jürgen Verweyen, Merzhausen, Germany
Dr. theol. hab. Louis Weimer, Bad Tolz, Germany
Prof. em. Dr. Siegfried Wiedenhofer, Unterliederbach a. Ts., Germany
Prof. em. Dr. Joseph Wohlmuth, Bonn, Germany
Senior teacher a.e.H. Dr. Josef Zöhrer, Germany
Dr. Cornelio Del Zotto, OFM, Rome, Italy

References

1978 establishments in West Germany
Organizations established in 1978
Pope Benedict XVI